The first season of the television comedy series Modern Family aired on ABC from September 23, 2009 to May 19, 2010. The season was produced by Lloyd-Levitan Productions in association with 20th Century Fox Television, with series creators Christopher Lloyd and Steven Levitan serving as executive producers. The series was picked up on April 29, 2009, and finished production in August 2009.

The series is set in Los Angeles and focuses on the family lives of Jay Pritchett (Ed O'Neill), his daughter Claire Dunphy (Julie Bowen), and his son Mitchell Pritchett (Jesse Tyler Ferguson). Claire is a homemaker mom married to Phil Dunphy (Ty Burrell); they have three children, Haley (Sarah Hyland), the typical teenager, Alex (Ariel Winter), the smart middle child, and Luke (Nolan Gould), the offbeat only son. Jay is married to a much younger Colombian woman, Gloria (Sofía Vergara), and is helping her raise her pre-teen son, Manny (Rico Rodriguez). Mitchell and his partner Cameron Tucker (Eric Stonestreet) have adopted a Vietnamese baby, Lily (twins Ella Hiller and Jaden Hiller). Season one of Modern Family aired on Wednesday nights at 9 p.m. and consisted of 24 episodes.

The season received critical acclaim from most critics, many of whom named it the best new show of 2009.  The episode "Fizbo" received overwhelmingly positive reviews from critics, with BuddyTV naming it the second best show of 2009. It was nominated for 14 Emmy Awards; eight Primetime Emmy Awards and six Creative Arts Emmy Awards, the most nominations for a comedy series after Glee and 30 Rock. The series was also a ratings success and the first season averaged 9.39 million viewers for all 24 episodes. The ratings led to ABC renewing the series for a second season midway through the first. The first season DVD and Blu-ray Disc box set was released on September 21, 2010.

Production

Conception
While working in the office Lloyd and Levitan were telling stories about their family and they thought that could be a show idea, and started working around the idea of a family being observed in a mockumentary style show. They then later decided it would be a show about three families and their experiences. The show was originally called My American Family. Originally, the camera crew would be run by a fictitious Dutch filmmaker named Geert Floortje who had lived with Jay's family as a teenage exchange student. CBS, not ready to use the single-camera style of filming, nor ready to make another large commitment, did not accept the series. NBC, already having two shows of similar style (mockumentary), The Office and Parks and Recreation, decided against accepting the series until the success of the other two series decreases. ABC accepted the series. The series quickly became a priority for ABC after the pilot episode tested high with focus groups, resulting in the network ordering 13 episodes and adding it to the 2009–2010 fall lineup days ahead of ABC's official schedule announcement.

The series was given a full season pickup on October 8, 2009. On January 12, 2010, ABC Entertainment President Stephen McPherson announced that Modern Family had been renewed for a second season.

Crew
Lloyd-Levitan Productions and 20th Century Fox Television produced the series during the first season with the show's creators, Christopher Lloyd and Steven Levitan as show runner and executive producer. Lloyd and Levitan previously worked on Frasier, Wings, Just Shoot Me, The Wonder Years. The show's writers include Paul Corrigan, Sameer Gardezi, Joe Lawson, Levitan, Lloyd, Dan O'Shannon, Brad Walsh, Caroline Williams, Bill Wrubel, and Danny Zuker. The season also featured episodes directed by seven different directors. Modern Family featured both a "team of directors" as well as several freelance directors. Jason Winer directed more than half the episodes including both the series premiere and the season finale. Michael Spiller directed two episodes of the first season and went on to direct a majority of the second season. Series co-creator, Steven Levitan, also directed the penultimate episode, "Hawaii". The season also featured two freelance directors, Kevin Sullivan and Reginald Hudlin.

Cast

Modern Family employs an ensemble cast. The series is set in Los Angeles and focuses on the family lives of Jay Pritchett (Ed O'Neill), his daughter Claire Dunphy (Julie Bowen), and his son Mitchell Pritchett (Jesse Tyler Ferguson). Claire is a homemaker mom married to Phil Dunphy (Ty Burrell); they have three children, Haley (Sarah Hyland), the typical teenager, Alex (Ariel Winter), the smart middle child, and Luke (Nolan Gould), the offbeat only son. Jay is married to a much younger Colombian woman, Gloria (Sofía Vergara), and is helping her raise her pre-teen son, Manny (Rico Rodriguez). Mitchell and his partner Cameron Tucker (Eric Stonestreet) have adopted a Vietnamese baby, Lily (twins Ella Hiller and Jaden Hiller). Ed O'Neill, who is probably the best known actor of the series initially had lost the part to Craig T. Nelson although he was eventually cast after Nelson turned down the part due to money problems. It was also difficult for Julie Bowen as she was pregnant with twins while filming the pilot episode. Eric Stonestreet had to try harder for the part of Cameron Tucker, due to him being an unknown actor at the time. Jesse Tyler Ferguson initially auditioned for the role of Cameron, but the producers thought he was better suited for Mitchell.

The season also featured multiple guest stars. The season featured the first appearance of Fred Willard as Phil's father as Frank Dunphy in two episodes, "Undeck the Halls" and "Travels with Scout". He later went on to be nominated at the 62nd Primetime Emmy Awards for Outstanding Guest Actor in a Comedy Series, but lost to Neil Patrick Harris's performance on Glee. Other guest spots included Elizabeth Banks and Edward Norton who appeared in the eighth episode, "Great Expectations" with both performances receiving positive reviews. Shelley Long appeared in the fourth episode of the season as DeDe Pritchett, Claire and Mitchell's mother and Jay's ex-wife. Many critics gave her casting positive reviews, with Entertainment Weekly writer Michael Slezak calling it a "stroke of genius".

Episodes

Reception

Ratings
The season ranked 21st in the seasonal 18–49 demographic ratings with an average of 3.9 rating/10% share in the demographic meaning that the season was watched by an average of 3.9% of households and 10% average of all televisions were tuned to the season when it was broadcast. The season also ranked 36th in the seasonal total viewers with an average of 9.48 million households. The season became the third highest-rated new series, the second highest-rated new scripted show, and the highest-rated new sitcom that season. The penultimate episode, "Hawaii", was the highest-rated episode of the season with a 4.3 rating/11% share in the Nielsen ratings and at the time was the highest-rated episode of the series. The lowest-rated episode was "Fizbo", which was viewed in 7.12 million households with a 2.4 rating/7% share in the 18–49 demographic although this is might have been caused by the episode airing on Thanksgiving Eve. The ratings later went up mid-season despite competition against American Idol with two episodes ("My Funky Valentine" and "Fifteen Percent") tying with the pilot as the second highest-rated episode of the season.

Reviews

The first season has been met with unanimous positive reviews. It received a 'critically acclaimed' Metacritic score of 86 out of 100. Entertainment Weekly gave it an A−, calling it "...immediately recognizable as the best new sitcom of the fall..." In Times review the show was named "the funniest new family comedy of the year."  It has also been compared to the 1970s series Soap, in regards to the multiple family aspect, as well as Arrested Development. Some have made comparisons to The Office and Parks and Recreation, due to their mockumentary formats. BuddyTV named the show the second best show in 2009 saying "Every actor is fantastic, every family is interesting, and unlike many shows, there isn't a weak link."

Robert Canning of IGN gave the season an 8.9 saying it was "Great" and called it "Simply put, Modern Family was one of the best new comedies of the season." He also praised the ensemble cast and the characters calling them lovable. Jason Hughes of TV Squad named the show along with ABC Comedy Wednesday (The Middle and Cougar Town) as one of the best shows of 2009. TV Squad writer Allison Waldman called the series "overrated" saying "it's disconnected and uneven" and "The hokey, voice-over narrations at the end of most shows is toe-curling.". It was also named the Best Sitcom of the TV Season by BuddyTV reviewer John Kubicek. He also stated "A killer cast and the funniest and smartest writing TV has seen in a long time helped make this freshman comedy not only the funniest show on TV, but also the best." A poll by the Los Angeles Times said Modern Family is to win Primetime Emmy Award for Outstanding Comedy Series and beat three year in a row winner 30 Rock. Ken Tucker of Entertainment Weekly ranked the season the third best series of 2009, praising it for finding its tone so fast.

"Fizbo" received positive reviews from critics with many naming it the best episode of the season. It ranked number 27th on BuddyTV list of top 50 best episodes of 2009 calling it a "perfect ensemble piece". Robert Canning of IGN said that the episode "continued its trend of outstanding episodes", while The A.V. Club writer named the episode "best episode since the first couple [of episodes]". Nolan Gould, who plays Luke Dunphy, considers it his favorite episode of the series. The episode was later nominated for Primetime Emmy Award for Outstanding Supporting Actor in a Comedy Series for Eric Stonestreet's performance as Cameron Tucker and later won.

Modern Family drew criticism from some quarters for its portrayal of Cameron and Mitchell as not being physically affectionate with each other. The criticism spawned a Facebook campaign to demand Mitchell and Cameron be allowed to kiss. In response to the controversy, producers released a statement that a season two episode would address Mitchell's discomfort with public displays of affection. Executive producer Levitan has said that it was unfortunate that the issue had arisen, since the show's writers had always planned on such a scene "as part of the natural development of the show." The episode, "The Kiss" eventually aired and drew praise from multiple critics for the subtle nature of the kiss and became the fourth highest-rated episode of the series so far.

Awards and nominations

The series has been nominated for numerous awards, of which 10 were won. The first of which were Best Episodic Comedy for the "pilot episode" tying with 30 Rocks Robert Carlock for his work on "Apollo, Apollo" and New Series at the Writers Guild of America Awards 2009. The pilot episode also won Outstanding Directorial Achievement in Comedy Series for the "Pilot" and also at the Young Artist Awards for Outstanding Comedy Series. The season also received a Peabody Award.  The show was later nominated for 14 Primetime Emmy Awards, the third most Emmy nominations for a comedy series for 2009 after Glee and 30 Rock. The season later won 6 of the 14 Emmy nominations including Primetime Emmy Award for Outstanding Comedy Series. The season is currently nominated for Outstanding Directing for a Comedy Series for series co-creator Steven Levitan's work on the penultimate episode, "Hawaii".

References

External links
 Episode recaps at ABC.com
 

 
2009 American television seasons
2010 American television seasons
1